Death Wish franchise is an American action-crime-drama film series based on the 1972 novel by Brian Garfield. The films follow the character Paul Kersey, portrayed by Charles Bronson in the original series, and Bruce Willis in the 2018 remake. While the first film received mixed reviews, the subsequent sequels, as well as the remake, were panned by critics and the series made $87 million against a combined production budget of $61 million.

Background

Paul Kersey 
Kersey was born in East Philadelphia, Pennsylvania in 1921. Kersey's father was an English-American who originated from Northern England and his mother comes from Provo, Utah. Kersey's Norman English ancestor, Pierre Whítmoré Keèrsye, anglicized his surname to Kersey. Paul was raised around  guns and became a good shot as a child. After Paul's father was killed in a hunting accident, his mother prevented him from being around guns anymore. Kersey served in World War II in the Pacific theater as a combat medic from 1944 to 1945. In 1950 Paul graduated from Princeton University wth a degree in Civil Engineering. In 1953, he was a conscientious objector in the medical corps in the Korean War. In the late 1950s, he traveled to New York City to settle down.

Novels

Death Wish (1972)

Death Sentence (1975)

Films

Death Wish (1974) 

Paul Kersey is an architect who served in the Korean War in the medical corps, and he lives in New York City. One day, three street punks posing as grocery delivery boys break into his apartment while he is at work. They beat up Paul's wife, Joanna and rape his married daughter, Carol Toby, spray-painting both of them and the wall of their apartment "just for fun." Joanna later dies of her injuries, and Carol is left catatonic. Paul's life is ripped apart by this attack.

Paul's boss decides that Paul needs to get out of New York for a while, so he sends him to Tucson, Arizona to meet with a client. There, Paul witnesses a mock gunfight at Old Tucson Studios, a reconstructed Western frontier town that is often used as a movie set. Paul's client gets him interested in guns. It turns out that Paul grew up around guns and is a good shot himself. When Paul returns to New York, he discovers that his client has given him a .32 Colt Police Positive revolver as a gift. When the police are unable to find the rapists, Paul sets out to find them himself. Paul begins patrolling the streets, killing street criminals as he encounters them.

Death Wish II (1982) 

Kersey and his daughter Carol, who is still catatonic, now live in Los Angeles because Paul accepted a deal from the New York City Police Department to leave town so they would not tell anyone that he was the vigilante. Paul now has a new woman in his life, KABC news reporter, Geri Nichols. One day while he is out with Carol and Geri, he is mugged by a gang of five punks. Paul fights back, but they get away. The muggers go to his house, gag, rape, and murder Kersey's housekeeper. They then wait for Paul to return home and knock him unconscious and kidnap and rape Carol. The assault brings her out of her coma and she tries to get away by jumping through the second story window, but she dies when she is impaled on an iron fence stake.

Beside himself with grief and rage, Paul dedicates his life to avenging Carol. He rents a ratty hotel room under another name, and starts looking for the rapists. When the Los Angeles Police Department deduces that they have a vigilante on their hands, they decide to consult with the New York City Police Department, who fear that Kersey is killing criminals again.

Death Wish 3 (1985) 

After killing criminals in Los Angeles, Paul Kersey returns to New York City to visit his friend, Charley, who lives in one of the worst parts of New York City. But when Paul arrives at Charley's apartment, he finds Charley dying after a vicious beating by a gang led by Manny Fraker, and the police enter the apartment and find Paul standing over Charley's body. Paul is arrested for the murder, but police chief Richard S. Shriker offers a deal: Paul can kill all the criminals he wants if he keeps the cops informed about the death count. Though Kersey says that he stopped his mugger slayings, Shriker releases Paul to go after Fraker. Paul moves into Charley's apartment in a decaying building in the middle of a bombed out gang war zone.

Death Wish 4: The Crackdown (1987) 

Kersey had largely retired from slaying muggers shortly after Death Wish 3. In Death Wish 4: The Crackdown, Detective Phil Nozaki mentions mugger shootings downtown two years previous to the events of Death Wish 4, to which Detective Sid Reiner responds by saying that "the vigilante retired years ago". In any event, Kersey kept regular residence in Los Angeles, regardless of his breaking off his mugger slayings. Paul Kersey is back in Los Angeles, and is dating reporter, Karen Sheldon, who has a teenage daughter named Erica. While Erica is at an arcade with her boyfriend, Randy, she dies of a crack cocaine overdose, setting the scene for a departure from the series' focus on sexual assault by instead putting drug abuse as a center stage. Later, Randy goes back to the arcade with Kersey following him.

Randy confronts Jo-Jo Ross, the dealer that Erica got the crack from. Randy tells JoJo that he is going to the police, but Jo-Jo kills him to keep him quiet. Kersey shows up and shoots Jo-Jo with a .380 Walther PPK pistol, and watches him land on the electrical roof of the bumper-car ride, where he is electrocuted. Next, Paul gets a note and a phone call from a publisher named Nathan White, who tells him that he knows about the death of Jo-Jo. Nathan explains to Kersey that his daughter had died of an overdose, so he wants to hire Kersey to wipe out the drug trade in L.A. -- and in particular to target Ed Zacharias and The Romero Brothers Jack and Tony, rival drug kingpins who are the city's two main drug suppliers.

Death Wish V: The Face of Death (1994) 

Kersey's secret identity as the vigilante was effectively blown in Death Wish 4: The Crackdown as Detective Sid Reiner of the Los Angeles Police Department, less sympathetic than Chief Richard Shriker or Detective Frank Ochoa, discovered it. Reiner stated he would arrest Kersey as the latter walked away. In any event, as revealed in Death Wish V (though no direct reference to Reiner's discovery of Kersey's identity) Kersey retired and entered the Witness Protection Program and assumed the alias, Paul Stewart in New York City after meeting with the District Attorney of New York.

Seven years would pass before Kersey's peace again became interrupted. New York City's garment district has turned into Dodge City when a mobster named Tommy O'Shea muscles in on the fashion trade of his ex-wife, Olivia Regent. Olivia is engaged to Paul Kersey, who provides a sense of security for her and her daughter, Chelsea. Olivia is not impressed when Tommy tortures her manager, Big Al, so Tommy hires an enforcer named Freddie Flakes, a master of disguise. Freddie dons women's clothing to follow Olivia into a ladies' room, where he smashes her face into a mirror, causing permanent disfigurement. In the offices of District Attorney Brian Hoyle and his associate, Hector Vasquez, Paul and Olivia vow to see to it that Tommy should be prosecuted. Later, Freddie and two of his men disguise themselves as cops, infiltrate Olivia's apartment, and shoot her dead. This causes Kersey to go from his retirement to his vigilante ways again as he's trying to get rid of Tommy's ruthless irish mob organization by killing all of his gang members that were responsible for his fiancée's death.

Death Wish (2018) 

Paul Kersey (Bruce Willis), a Chicago-area Emergency Room surgeon, lives with his wife, Lucy (Elisabeth Shue), and daughter, Jordan (Camila Morrone). When the family visits a restaurant with Paul's brother Frank (Vincent D'Onofrio), a valet named Miguel photographs their home address from their car's navigation software after hearing about a night they plan to be away from home. However, Paul is called to work that night, and Jordan and Lucy are home when the three armed burglars break into their home. Moments later, one of the burglars is scarred from Lucy and Jordan's efforts to fight back in defense of their lives and home.  The invading criminals ultimately shoot Lucy to death, and Jordan is seriously wounded and subsequently comatose from their attempted murder of her.

Paul becomes frustrated with the lack of police progress on the case, led by Detectives Kevin Raines (Dean Norris) and Leonore Jackson (Kimberly Elise). After seeing two men harassing a woman, Paul tries to intervene but is kicked and punched to the ground by the two assailants. He visits a gun store, but there is a long mandatory waiting period to legally purchase a firearm.  When a gang member is brought to the hospital and his Glock 17 falls off the gurney, Paul takes it and practices shooting.  He uses the gun to stop a carjacking, a video of which goes viral. During the effort, he cuts his left hand due to improperly handling the pistol. Continuing his efforts as a vigilante, Paul decides to kill a drug dealer calling himself "the Ice Cream Man" after a young boy comes to the hospital with a gunshot wound in his leg. Paul calmly walks up to the pistol-holding drug dealer, referring to himself as "his last customer," and shoots him.  News, TV, and radio reports consistently demonstrate mixed feelings of support and condemnation of Paul's developing war against violent criminals.

Cast and crew

Cast 
This table shows the principal characters and the actors who have portrayed them throughout the franchise.
A dark grey cell indicates the character was not in the film, or that the character's presence in the film has not yet been announced.

Crew

Reception

Box office performance

Critical and public response

Analysis 
In 2006, a film historic, Paul Talbot released Bronson's Loose!: The Making of the Death Wish Films, which covers the making of the five films with interviews conducted with author, Brian Garfield, director Michael Winner, producer Bobby Roberts, producer Pancho Kohner, and more.

In 2010, novelist Christopher Sorrentino published a book-length monograph, also called Death Wish on the original film.  In the course of a deep analysis of the film's content, Sorrentino declares Death Wish to be mythic and apolitical, and using The New York Timess Vincent Canby as a prime example, holds it up as an instance when reviewers used a film's perceived political incorrectness as a pretext to savage it.

Music

Soundtracks

Other media

Video game 
The third film in the original series, was made into a video game of the same name by Gremlin Graphics for the ZX Spectrum, Commodore 64, MSX and Amstrad CPC. In the game, the player controls Paul Kersey in the streets and buildings in a free-roaming, all-out gunfight with gangsters. It was one of the goriest games of its time, featuring multiple weapons with detailed, different damage patterns and the possibility to kill civilians. Because the original copyright owners of the game didn't have any interest in renewing copyright, the game fall into the "abandonware" and is considered public domain until proven otherwise.

Film based on novel's sequel 
The film, Death Sentence (2007) was based loosely on the Death Wish novel's 1975 sequel of the same name. The film stars Kevin Bacon as Nick Hume, a man who takes the law into his own hands when his son is murdered by a gang as an initiation ritual.

In popular culture 
In 2020, the pseudonymous author "Paul Kersey", who had published numerous anti-black articles on white nationalist blogs and websites, was identified as Michael J. Thompson, a longtime employee at several mainstream conservative organizations. Thompson chose his pen name in reference to the films' protagonist.

References

External links 
 

American action thriller films
American vigilante films
Action film series
Crime film series
Film series introduced in 1974
Pentalogies
Thriller film series